The Basra reed warbler (Acrocephalus griseldis) is a "warbler" of the genus Acrocephalus. It is an endemic breeder in Southwestern Iran, East and southern Iraq, Kuwait, and Israel in extensive beds of papyrus and reeds. It is easily mistaken for the great reed warbler but is a bit smaller, has whiter underparts and has a narrower, longer and more pointed bill. It winters in East Africa. It is a very rare vagrant in Europe. The call is a gruff chaar, deeper than a reed warbler's.

It is found in aquatic vegetation in or around shallow, fresh or brackish water, still or flowing, mainly in dense reedbeds. It is found in thickets and bushland when migrating or wintering.

In 2007, the species was discovered as a breeding bird in northern Israel.

Due to the drainage of the Mesopotamian marshes throughout the 1980s and the 1990s, and the subsequent near destruction of its native habitat, the Basra reed warbler is considered an endangered species.

References

Basra reed warbler
Birds of the Middle East
Birds of East Africa
Basra reed warbler